Remote is an ambient music group. The group is a collaboration between film score composer and ambient icon Roger Eno, and Danish production duo and Cafe Del Mar favourites, Miro.

The group's first album Opening Door, a collection of thirteen pieces that provide a unique twist on old-school electronic ambient released on Tundra, was described as "a rolling soundscape of chilled cinematic moments combined with downtempo pop sensibilities."

Discography 
Opening Doors (2002)
"Hello Dreamer" 12" vinyl
"Postcard" 12" vinyl

British ambient music groups
British electronic music groups